The University of Debrecen is a university located in Debrecen, Hungary. It is the oldest continuously operating institution of higher education in Hungary  ever since its establishment in 1538. The university has a well established programme in the English language for international students, particularly in the Medical and Engineering field, which first established education in English in 1886. There are nearly 6000 international students studying at the university.

Until 2014 technical Academy Awards (Oscars) have been awarded to five former students.

The university also operates an associated Basic Medicine campus in Geochang County, South Korea.

The University of Debrecen's acceptance rate is 25% making it one of the most competitive universities in Central Europe.

University of Debrecen is ranked 501st in QS World University Rankings by Top Universities and has an overall score of 4.1 stars with its prestigious Medical School ranked 19th position worldwide along with the Engineering department ranked 59th, Computer Sciences ranked 37th, Veterinary department ranked 27th, Pharmaceutics and Toxicology department ranked 26th worldwide. It is also notable for its Mathematics, Astronomy and Physics department which is ranked 77th, 83rd and 79th worldwide respectively.

History

The early formation
Higher education began in Debrecen with the Calvinist College of Debrecen, which was founded in 1538. Over centuries of its existence it was one of the key institutions of higher education in Hungary. In the beginning of the 20th century the college was transformed into a university, and has a strong link and cooperation with the present Calvinist College's Debrecen Reformed Theological University.

Before, and during World War I
In 1908, the Calvinist Academy of Humanities was created, and in 1912, the Hungarian Royal University was founded. The university incorporated the theology, law, and arts faculties of the college and added a medical school. Teaching began in 1914 in the old Calvinist College buildings. In 1918, the first new medical school building was opened, and the original medical school campus was completed in 1927.

Between the two World Wars
In 1921, the university took the name of István Tisza, former prime minister of Hungary. In 1932 the university's main building was completed. It is the largest building in the city, and was designed in eclectic and neo-baroque style.

Between 1945 and 1990
In 1949/1950, the university was restructured under communist control. The primary goal of the "reorganization" was to split the university into smaller, less integrated institutions, and also to weaken or even dissolve units which did not fit to the Soviet agenda of the day. The Faculty of Theology was returned to the Calvinist College, the Faculty of Medicine became an independent university (until 2000), the Faculty of Law was discontinued, and members of the teaching staff were expelled from the university. The departments of English, French, Italian, German, and Classical Philology were closed down, while the Department of Russian expanded dramatically. The teaching of western languages resumed only after 1956, with the exception of Italian which was not offered again until the 1990s.

The Faculty of Natural Sciences became an independent faculty in 1949, and moved into the new Chemistry Building in 1970.

In 1952 the Faculty of Arts and the Faculty of Natural Sciences changed their name to Lajos Kossuth University, which they retained until 2000.

21st century
On January 1, 2000, the colleges and universities of Hajdú-Bihar county, the University of Agriculture, Lajos Kossuth University, and the Medical University, were combined. The resulting University of Debrecen had five universities and three college-level faculties, and 20,000 students. The Conservatory of Debrecen and schools of the university in Hajdúböszörmény and Nyíregyháza joined later.

The Debrecen Summer School, founded in 1927, is also located on campus, although it is technically independent of the university. The School teaches Hungarian culture and Hungarian as a foreign language to foreigners, year-round.

The most popular journal of the university is Egyetemi Élet ('University Life') and the leading online media of students is www.egyetemportal.hu. The university also publishes the Hungarian Journal of English and American Studies

Structure

Faculties and colleges

Faculty of Agriculture and Food Sciences and Environmental Management
Faculty of Humanities
Faculty of Dentistry
Faculty of Economics and Business
Faculty of Medicine
Faculty of Informatics
Faculty of Law
Faculty of Music
Faculty of Pharmacy
Faculty of Science and Technology
Faculty of Public Health
Faculty of Engineering
Faculty of Child and Special Needs Education

Campus

 The university has three major campuses in Debrecen: the older main campus, which hosts the majority of the departments of the faculties of humanities, science,  medicine, music and also the botanical garden; the younger "Kassai-road campus" where most of the buildings of the faculties of law economy, and informatics are located, and the Böszörményi campus which hosts the Faculty of Agricultural and Food Sciences and Environmental Management. However, besides these, numerous smaller units are spread across the city, for example the departments of physics and the Institute of Nuclear Research  of the HAS forming a compact "mini-campus", or the Faculty of Agronomy. The Faculty of Engineering also enjoys its own campus on Ótemető street.

Library 

The library of the University of Debrecen is the largest university library in Hungary, and one of the two national libraries of the country (the other being the National Széchényi Library in Budapest). The number of records in the library is above 6 million.

Computing
The university hosts the largest computing cluster in Hungary (203 TFlop/s) called "Leo" (after Leo Szilard), which, as of 2015 is the 370th in the world's Top500 supercomputers. A new supercluster will be installed at 2022.

Notable alumni and professors

Endre Ady, poet (1877–1919)
János Arany, writer and poet (1817–1882)
Dezső Baltazár, reformed bishop (1871–1936)
Ézsaiás Budai, professor of humanities and theology (1766–1841)
Mihály Csokonai Vitéz, poet (1773–1805)
Pál Ember Debreczeni, priest (?–1710)
Sámuel Diószegi, priest, botanist (1760–1813)
Lajos Domokos, judge, writer (1728–1803)
Mihály Fazekas, writer, botanist (1766–1828)
István Hatvani, mathematician (1718–1786)
Endre Hőgyes, physician (1847–1906)
Ferenc Kerekes, chemist, mathematician (1799–1850)
Loránd Kesztyűs, physician, immunologist, and pathophysiologist (1915−1979)
Ferenc Kölcsey, poet and politician (1790–1838)
Imre Lakatos, mathematician and philosopher (1922–1974)
József Lugossy, linguist (1812–1884)
Ferenc Medgyessy, sculptor (1881–1958)
Zsigmond Móricz, writer (1879–1942)
Alfréd Rényi, mathematician (1921–1970)
Magda Szabó, writer (1917–2007)
Sandor Szalay, physicist (1909–1987)
Andor Szentiványi, physician (1926–2005)
Tamás Vicsek, professor of physics
Tamas Juhasz, Peabody Veterans Memorial High School Chemistry Teacher
 Kálmán Varga, physicist
István Weszprémi, physician (1723–1799)
Zsuzsanna Jakab, WHO Regional Director for Europe (2010–2014; 2015–2019)
Gyula Priskin, Academy Award winner 2010, for "Lustre", software for DI
Tamás Perlaki, Academy Award winner 2010, "Lustre"
Márk Jászberényi, Academy Award winner 2010, "Lustre"
Imre Major, Academy Award winner 2014, for "Mudbox" 3-D software
Csaba Kőhegyi, Academy Award winner 2014, for "Mudbox" 3-D software
Halima Nuhu Sanda, Public Health Expert and Girlchild education and women empowerment and leadership advocate.

Gallery

See also
 List of modern universities in Europe (1801–1945)

References

External links

 Official website

 
Debrecen
Medical schools in Hungary
1538 establishments in Europe
Buildings and structures in Debrecen
Education in Hajdú-Bihar County
16th-century establishments in Hungary
Educational institutions established in the 1530s